McLain is a surname. Notable people with the surname include:

Denny McLain, American baseball player
Ellen McLain, American voice actor
Hardy McLain (born 1952), American hedge fund manager
Jeremiah McLain Rusk, American politician, 15th governor of the state of Wisconsin
Masey McLain, American actress
Matt McLain, American baseball player
Raymond S. McLain, American military general
Tommy McLain, American singer

Fictional characters:
Ember McLain, character from the animated series Danny Phantom

Other possible meanings 
McLain, Mississippi, United States
McLain State Park, Michigan
Big Jim McLain, a 1952 film starring John Wayne.
Clan MacLaine of Lochbuie, a highland Scottish clan.

See also 
McLean (disambiguation)
McLaine